The discography of Papoose, an American rapper signed to his own label Honor B4 Money Records and formerly Jive Records, consists of four studio albums, 29 mixtapes, and eight singles.

Albums

Studio albums

Mixtapes

Compilation mixtapes

EPs

Singles

As lead artist

As featured artist

Guest appearances

References 

Discographies of American artists
Hip hop discographies